Jonathan Hunt (born 6 August 1986), known professionally as Joth Hunt, is an Australian Pentecostal Christian worship leader, singer-songwriter, producer and music director who primarily writes praise and worship songs. He grew up in the Planetshakers Church, and is a member of the Planetshakers band. Hunt has released two solo albums, titled To Exist (2002) and Make a Stand (2004).

Biography
Joth Hunt was born in 1986, in Australia. He grew up in a musical family and started playing piano, drums and guitar at the age of 7. He began learning to record music at the age of 14 and began producing music. He is currently producing Planetshakers albums.

Personal life
Hunt married Racheal on 26 April 2010. Together they have two sons named Josiah Eli and Gabriel Blaze Hunt. In January 2019 he was diagnosed with cancer, and due to his illness he wrote the songs "Only Way" and "God Is On The Throne" victory and faith declaration songs about Hunt's situation. After 10 days the doctor performed an operation in which after further analysis the cancer appeared to have been cured.

Discography

2002: To Exist (Independent)
2004: Make a Stand (Independent)

As featured artist 
 2012: Rez Power (Live) - Free Chapel (feat. Israel Houghton & Joth Hunt)
 2013: Right Here Right Now (Single) – Young Chozen feat. Joth Hunt
 2016: We Are Free (Single) – Nathan Ironside feat. Joth Hunt
 2017: I Feel So Alive (Single) – René Abraham feat. Joth Hunt

Awards and nominations
In the 2014, Joth Hunt was nominated for the Arpa Awards as the best producer of the year for the album Nada Es Imposible in Spanish.

References

Singers from Melbourne
Songs written by Joth Hunt
Planetshakers members
Australian male singer-songwriters
Australian gospel singers
Australian Pentecostals
Christian music songwriters
Performers of contemporary worship music
Australian Charismatics
1986 births
Living people